Crooked Creek is a stream in Montgomery County in the U.S. state of Missouri. It is a tributary of Coon Creek.

Crooked Creek was so named on account of its frequent meanders.

See also
List of rivers of Missouri

References

Rivers of Montgomery County, Missouri
Rivers of Missouri